Lorns Olav Skjemstad (born 10 March 1940) is a retired Norwegian cross-country skier. Competing in the 30 km event he won the national title in 1965 and placed 11th at the 1968 Winter Olympics.

Cross-country skiing results

Olympic Games

World Championships

References

1940 births
Living people
People from Inderøy
Cross-country skiers at the 1968 Winter Olympics
Norwegian male cross-country skiers
Olympic cross-country skiers of Norway
Sportspeople from Trøndelag